Aleksandr Igorevich Bulychyov (born 27 July 2001) is a Belarusian professional footballer who plays for Maxline.

Honors
Shakhtyor Soligorsk
Belarusian Premier League champion: 2020

References

External links 
 
 

1999 births
Sportspeople from Vitebsk
Living people
Belarusian footballers
Association football midfielders
FC Shakhtyor Soligorsk players
FC Gorodeya players
FC Vitebsk players
FC Energetik-BGU Minsk players
FC Dynamo Brest players
FC Torpedo Vladimir players
FC Dnepr Rogachev players
Belarusian Premier League players
Russian Second League players
Belarusian expatriate footballers
Expatriate footballers in Russia
Belarusian expatriate sportspeople in Russia